Aleksandra Georgievna Chudina (6 November 1923 – 28 October 1990) was a Soviet athlete who excelled in field hockey, volleyball, and various track and field events.

Field hockey
Chudina took a wide range of sports and excelled first in field hockey, where she started playing as a defender in 1937 and later changed to a forward. With her team Dynamo Moscow she won several major tournaments at the city and national levels between 1937 and 1947.

Athletics
Chudina then changed to athletics, and had a first international success in 1946, when she finished second in the high jump at the European championships. At the 1952 Summer Olympics she won silver medals in the javelin throw and long jump and a bronze in the high jump. On 22 May 1954, she set a new world record in the high jump at 1.73 meters. The same year she won two European medals in the pentathlon and long jump, but finished only sixth in the high jump.

Volleyball
Between 1947 and 1963 Chudina was also a member, and often the captain, of the Dynamo and national volleyball teams. With the national teams she won world championships in 1952, 1956 and 1960, and European championships in 1949, 1950, 1951 and 1958, finishing second in 1955.

Personal life
Chudina was one of the most popular Soviet sportspersons of the 1950s, and was then used by the Soviet media as an example of superiority of the national sport programs. She was a colorful person who had a coarse low voice, enjoyed alcohol drinking and playing cards in a company, and was a careless car driver. After retiring from competitions (as she was suspected in being an Intersex person) she worked as a sports administrator and was soon forgotten. She had developed tuberculosis and lost one leg due to gangrene. A chain smoker through much of her life, she died of a stomach cancer, aged 66.

References

1923 births
1990 deaths
People from Tula Oblast
Soviet women's volleyball players
Soviet pentathletes
Soviet female javelin throwers
Soviet female high jumpers
Soviet female long jumpers
Olympic athletes of the Soviet Union
Olympic silver medalists for the Soviet Union
Olympic bronze medalists for the Soviet Union
Athletes (track and field) at the 1952 Summer Olympics
European Athletics Championships medalists
Dynamo sports society athletes
Recipients of the Order of Lenin
Honoured Masters of Sport of the USSR
Deaths from cancer in Russia
Deaths from stomach cancer
Burials in Troyekurovskoye Cemetery
Medalists at the 1952 Summer Olympics
Olympic silver medalists in athletics (track and field)
Olympic bronze medalists in athletics (track and field)
Deaths from cancer in the Soviet Union